James Wolk (born March 22, 1985) is an American actor. He is known for his starring roles in the CBS comedy series The Crazy Ones (2013–2014), the AMC period drama series Mad Men (2013–2014), the CBS drama thriller series Zoo (2015–2017), the CBS All Access psychological thriller series Tell Me a Story (2018–2019), and the HBO superhero limited series Watchmen (2019).

Wolk also had starring roles in the films You Again (2010), For a Good Time, Call... (2012), The Stanford Prison Experiment (2015), and Mercy (2016).

Early life and education
Wolk was born in Farmington Hills, Michigan, the son of Edie, an art teacher, and Robert Wolk, a shoe store owner (Sundance Shoes West Bloomfield & Birmingham MI). His family is Jewish, and Wolk was raised in Reform Judaism. During his teenage years, Wolk worked as an emcee (MC) at Bar and Bat Mitzvahs. He graduated North Farmington High School in 2003 and from the University of Michigan School of Music, Theatre & Dance in 2007.

Career
In 2008, Wolk landed his first starring television role in Hallmark Hall of Fame's drama film Front of the Class, as Brad Cohen. He subsequently played the title character in the 2009 ABC pilot Solving Charlie. In 2010, Wolk was cast as the lead in the Fox drama series Lone Star, as Robert "Bob" Allen, a Texas con man married to the daughter of one of his targets while simultaneously maintaining a relationship in another town. Fox canceled the series after two episodes.

In 2010, Wolk had a role as Will in the romantic comedy film You Again. He played a presidential speechwriter named Andrew Pierce in Georgetown, a 2011 ABC pilot which did not go to air.

In the fall of 2011, Wolk joined the second season cast of the Showtime dramedy series Shameless, in the recurring role of Adam. The second season premiered January 8, 2012. Wolk played the recurring role of Grant in three episodes of the ABC comedy series Happy Endings, beginning with the first installment on February 8, 2012. In 2012, Wolk starred in the USA Network miniseries Political Animals, co-starring Sigourney Weaver and Ciarán Hinds. Wolk played Douglas Hammond, the "good" son of a former President of the United States (Hinds) and the current Secretary of State (Weaver).

In 2013, Wolk joined the sixth-season cast of the AMC period drama series Mad Men, playing mysterious junior account man Bob Benson. As the season progressed, Benson became one of the most talked-about characters on the show, and Wolk received a Satellite Award nomination. In the 2013-14 television season, Wolk was part of the cast of the CBS sitcom The Crazy Ones, starring Robin Williams and Sarah Michelle Gellar. He played a womanizing creative at the Chicago ad agency headed by Williams and Gellar, his second role as an ad agency worker after Mad Men.

In November 2014, Wolk was cast as the lead in the CBS drama thriller series Zoo, based on the novel by James Patterson and Michael Ledwidge. Zoo premiered in June 2015 and aired for three seasons. Wolk also starred as Craig in the 2014 comedy film Are You Joking?, as Noah Bernstein in the 2014 comedy-drama film There's Always Woodstock, and as Mike Penny in the 2015 drama thriller film The Stanford Prison Experiment. He also starred as Philip in the independent comedy film This Is Happening, which focuses on an estranged brother and sister who go on a road trip to find their runaway grandmother.

In 2016, Wolk starred as Brad in the thriller film Mercy, which was written and directed by Chris Sparling. In 2017, he guest-starred as Craig Heidecker, an innovative young tech billionaire, in multiple episodes of the Showtime drama series Billions. In 2018, Wolk guest-starred as FBI Special Agent Jeff Clayton in the Amazon drama series Goliath. He starred in the first season of the CBS All Access psychological thriller series Tell Me a Story, an anthology series adapting classic fairy tales with a modern horror spin. In late 2018, Wolk was cast as Senator Joe Keene Jr. in the HBO superhero limited series Watchmen, based on the DC Comics series of the same name. The series debuted on October 20, 2019, to universal acclaim.

In 2021, Wolk began to play the lead role of Joe Kimbreau in the NBC drama Ordinary Joe, which is developed and executive-produced by Russel Friend and Garrett Lerner.

Personal life
Wolk is on the board of directors of the Brad Cohen Tourette Foundation. From 2009 to 2012, he also volunteered at Camp Twitch and Shout, which is a camp in Winder, Georgia, for children, ages 7 to 17, who have Tourette syndrome.

Wolk met Elizabeth Jae Lynch, a schoolteacher, while the two of them were volunteering at Camp Twitch and Shout. In June 2015, the two were married in a ceremony that was held at Crossroads Estate, Firestone Winery in Los Olivos, California. They welcomed their first child, a boy, in early 2017, and also have a daughter.

Filmography

Film

Television

Awards and nominations

References

External links
 
 
 

1985 births
Living people
American male film actors
American male stage actors
American male television actors
American male voice actors
Jewish American male actors
Male actors from Michigan
People from Farmington Hills, Michigan
University of Michigan School of Music, Theatre & Dance alumni
21st-century American Jews
North Farmington High School alumni